The Bosniak-Serb Alliance (abbr. БОСС / BOSS) is a political party in the Sandžak region of Serbia, established in October 2022. Its leader is Samir Tandir, who was a leading figure in Muamer Zukorlić's political movement for several years and served in the National Assembly of Serbia from 2020 to 2022 as a member of the Justice and Reconciliation Party (Stranka pravde i pomirenja, SPP).

History
Samir Tandir was a member of the SPP and its antecedent parties between 2010 and 2022 and was a prominent ally of Chief Mufti Muamer Zukorlić. When the latter figure died in November 2021, control of the SPP passed to his son, Usame Zukorlić. Tandir had a poor relationship with the party's new leadership and did not seek re-election to the national assembly in 2022. He resigned from the party after the election, accusing it of carrying out "North Korea-style purges" of dissident voices and moving away from its original purpose.

In leaving the SPP, Tandir indicated that he would establish a new political party called the Bosniak-Serb Alliance. The party was officially launched in October 2022, with Tandir chosen as president of its initiative committee.

An electoral list aligned with the party is contesting the 2022 elections for the Bosniak National Council. The list bearer is Admir Muratović, an independent member of the Novi Pazar city assembly.

References

2022 establishments in Serbia
Political parties established in 2022